The Kh-25/Kh-25M (NATO: AS-10 'Karen) is a family of Soviet lightweight air-to-ground missiles with a modular range of guidance systems and a range of 10 km. The anti-radar variant (Kh-25MP) is known to NATO as the AS-12 'Kegler and has a range up to 40 km. Designed by Zvezda-Strela, the Kh-25 is derived from the laser-guided version of the Kh-23 Grom (AS-7 'Kerry'). The Kh-25 remains in widespread use despite the apparent development of a successor, the Kh-38.

Development
Based on an air-to-air missile, the beam-riding Kh-66 had been the Soviet Union's first air-to-ground missile for tactical aircraft, entering service in 1968. However it proved difficult to use in practice as the launch aircraft had to dive towards the target. A version with radio-command guidance, the Kh-23, was first tested in 1968 but problems with the guidance system meant that it would not enter service for another five years. So in 1971 work began on a version with a semi-active laser seeker, which became the Kh-25. This was initially known in the West as the Kh-23L. State testing began on 24 November 1974, and the Kh-25 entered production in 1975.

Work began on an anti-radar missile derived from the Kh-66 in 1972, using a passive radar seeker and SUR-73 autopilot. The long-range Kh-31 anti-radar missile came out of the same project. The Kh-27 began state testing on a MiG-27 on 8 August 1975 but did not enter service until 2 September 1980. It was assigned the NATO reporting name AS-12 'Kegler' and in effect it replaced the much heavier Kh-28 (AS-9 'Kyle').

In 1973 Victor Bugaiskii was appointed head engineer of the bureau and he started work on combining the Kh-23M, Kh-25 and Kh-27 into a single modular system to reduce costs and improve tactical flexibility. The Kh-27 missile was chosen as a basis, due to its more powerful rocket engine and new autopilot. This was completed by the end of 1978, resulting in the Kh-25MP (anti-radar), Kh-25ML (laser-guided) and Kh-25MR (radio-guided) family. NATO continued to refer to these as the AS-12 and AS-10 respectively, even though they could now be switched by a simple change of seeker head.

Design
The Kh-25 is very similar to the later version of the Kh-23 Grom, with cruciform canards and fins.

The Kh-25MP has two versions of its homing head, 1VP and 2VP, sensitive to different frequencies.

Combat history
The original Kh-25 entered service with the Soviet Air Force between 1973-5, equipping the MiG-23, MiG-27 and Su-17M. Since then it has been cleared for use on the MiG-21, MiG-29, Sukhoi Su-17/20/22 family, Sukhoi Su-24, Su-25 and Su-27. It can also be carried by attack helicopters such as the Kamov Ka-50.

The Kh-25MP can be fitted to the MiG-23/27, Su-17/22, Su-24 and Su-25.

Soviet war in Afghanistan
Starting in April 1986, during the second Battle of Zhawar, Kh-25MLs were used by Soviet Su-25 Frogfoots from the 378th OshAP (Independent Shturmovik Aviation Regiment) to attack Mujahideen cave entrances used as shelters and weapons storage facilities. Attacks were carried out from up to 4.5 nm (8 km).

Iraqi invasion of Kuwait
During the Iraqi invasion of Kuwait, on August 2, 1990 an Iraqi Air Force Sukhoi Su-22 from the No.109 Squadron (based at as-Shoibiyah AB) fired a single Kh-25MP anti-radar variant against a Kuwaiti MIM-23B I-HAWK SAM site at Bubiyan Island that had earlier downed another Su-22 from the same unit and a MiG-23BN from the 49th Squadron. This forced a radar shutdown on the HAWK. The HAWK battery (which was operated by some American contractors) was later captured by Iraqi special forces and found out to be in automatic mode of operation, after the contractors fled.

Chechen Wars
Russian Air Force Su-25s employed the Kh-25 in its two Chechen campaigns for attacks on fixed positions, such as mortars and bunkers. However, their usage wasn't extensive in relation to those of unguided bombs and rockets. The use of precision-guided munitions allowed air support in areas too dangerous for attack helicopters. Their use was not widespread in the First War as was in the Second, mainly due to differences in weather conditions and, probably, the need to keep a strategic reserve of stockpiles shortly after the fall of the USSR.

Russia intervention in Syria
Laser-guided Kh-25s were employed by Su-24 sweep wing strike aircraft against anti-Assad rebels in Syria.

Variants
NATO refers to all of the Kh-25 family as AS-10 'Karen' apart from the anti-radar variants. An "M" designation stands for "Modulnaya" – modular (seeker head).
 Kh-25 (Izdeliye 71, Kh-23L) – original laser-guided variant
 Kh-25ML – semi-active laser guidance with tandem warhead that can penetrate  of concrete
 Kh-25MA – active radar guidance, first offered for export in 1999
 Kh-25MS – satellite navigation (GPS or GLONASS)
 Kh-25MSE – export version of Kh-25MS, announced August 2005
 Kh-25MT – TV guidance
 Kh-25MTP – infra-red guidance variant of Kh-25MT
 Kh-25R/Kh-25MR – Radio-command guidance variant, it has a bigger  warhead.
 Kh-27 (Kh-27/M, AS-12 'Kegler') – original anti-radiation missile
 Kh-25MP (AS-12 'Kegler') – modular anti-radiation variant
 Kh-25MPU (AS-12 'Kegler') – Updated Kh-25MP

Training rounds have "U" designations, so, e.g., for the Kh-25ML there is:
 Kh-25MUL – combat training Kh-25ML
 Kh-25ML-UD – functional training missile
 Kh-25ML-UR – sectional training missile

Operators

Current operators
 : Algerian Air Force
 : Ethiopian Air Force, Kh-25ML on the Su-25
 : unknown status
 
 
 : The Defense Ministry ordered a large-scale upgrade of tactical antiradar air missiles Kh-25MP. They will be able to destroy both radars and armor, aircraft at airfields, bridges and river crossings, surface warships, etc. The missile will be also able to destroy fortified command posts and pillboxes.
 
 : still in use with Sukhoi Su-24s.

Former operators
  passed on successor and export countries
 
 
 
 
  probably some in Serbian / Yugoslavian arsenal

Similar weapons
 Kh-23M (AS-7 'Kerry') – predecessor to the Kh-25 had some technology "backported" from the Kh-25
 Kh-29 (AS-14 'Kedge') – 320 kg warhead; semi-active laser, IIR, passive radar and TV guidance with 10–30 km range
 Kh-59 (AS-13 'Kingbolt') – longer range missile with heavier warhead and TV guidance
 Kh-38 – successor to the Kh-25
 AGM-65 Maverick – similar lightweight missile in US service which has seen numerous guidance and warhead variants
 AGM-45 Shrike – US equivalent to the Kh-25MP anti-radar missile

Notes

External links
 Zvezda Kh-25 (AS-10 Karen) FAS

References
 
 Yak-130 02. August 2013
 Soviet/Russian Tactical Air - Surface Missiles

Cold War air-to-surface missiles of the Soviet Union
Kh-025
Kh-025
Kh-025
Kh-025
Tactical Missiles Corporation products
Anti-radiation missiles of the Cold War
Military equipment introduced in the 1970s